Maurizio Gasparri (born 18 July 1956) is an Italian politician.

Career
Gasparri was born in Rome to parents of Campanian origins. He was educated at the Liceo Torquato Tasso in the city. In his civilian life he worked as a journalist, becoming editor-in-chief of the Secolo d'Italia, the daily paper of the post-fascist Italian Social Movement (MSI).

Political career
Gasparri was formerly a member of the MSI - where he was deputy secretary of the movement's Youth Front (Fronte della Gioventù; FdG) throughout the mid-1980s - and the National Alliance (AN). From 2001 to 2005 he served as the Minister of Communications in the Berlusconi II Cabinet. It was during his time in this role that he pushed for controversial amendments to the country's telecommunications legislation, known collectively as the legge Gasparri. Following a weak showing in the regional elections of 2005, he was replaced in Berlusconi's third Cabinet by Mario Landolfi. 

Alongside Ignazio La Russa, Gasparri was considered a leader of the AN mainstream faction Destra Protagonista. During the XVI legislature (2008–13), he was president of The People of Freedom (PdL) bloc in the Senate. He is against jus soli, same-sex marriage and LGBT adoption.

Obama controversy
In the wake of Barack Obama's election in November 2008, Gasparri declared on RAI that "with Obama in the White House, perhaps al-Qaeda is happier". He was heavily criticized for his comments by the Italian Democratic Party.

Gallery

Bibliography
 1986 - Adolfo Urso: L'età dell'intelligenza, ed. Settimo Sigillo
 2005 - Fare il futuro, intervista a cura di Lucilla Parlato
 2007 - Il cuore a destra, ed. Rubbettino

Notes

External links
 Personal web site (Italian)

1956 births
Living people
Politicians from Rome
Italian Social Movement politicians
National Alliance (Italy) politicians
The People of Freedom politicians
Government ministers of Italy
Deputies of Legislature XI of Italy
Deputies of Legislature XII of Italy
Deputies of Legislature XIII of Italy
Deputies of Legislature XIV of Italy
Deputies of Legislature XV of Italy
Senators of Legislature XVI of Italy
Senators of Legislature XVII of Italy
Senators of Legislature XVIII of Italy
Vice presidents of the Senate (Italy)
20th-century Italian people
21st-century Italian people